The Heathcote Railway line was a railway line linking Bendigo and Heathcote Junction. It was opened in 1888, and, by 1890 it was fully operational. It was partially closed in 1958 and fully closed in 1968.

In 1975 it was chosen to dismantle the railway line and today, only several trestle bridges remain.

History
The line was authorised in 1881, and construction began in 1888. The first section between Kilmore and Bendigo opened in 1888, and the entire line was operational in 1890.
This line, including 50 bridges, took 21 months to complete at a cost of 88,409 pounds, and two derailments in the process.

Stations

The line had the following stations:
 Kilmore Junction - now 
 Leslie
 Bylands
 Kilmore
 Willowmavin
 Moranding
 High Camp Plain
 Pyalong
 Tooborac
 McIvor Road
 Derrinal
 Knowsley
 Axedale
 Axe Creek
 Strathfieldsaye
 Bendigo

References

Railway lines in Victoria (Australia)
Railway lines opened in 1888
1888 establishments in Australia
Bendigo